Brent Michael Suter (born August 29, 1989) is an American professional baseball pitcher for the Colorado Rockies of Major League Baseball (MLB). He has previously played in MLB for the Milwaukee Brewers.

Amateur career
Suter played high school baseball at Archbishop Moeller High School in Cincinnati, Ohio, and college baseball at Harvard University. In 2011, he played collegiate summer baseball with the Wareham Gatemen of the Cape Cod Baseball League. He was drafted by the Milwaukee Brewers in the 31st round of the 2012 Major League Baseball draft.

Professional career

Milwaukee Brewers
After signing, Suter made his professional debut with the Helena Brewers where he was 4-2 with a 3.92 ERA in 12 games (11 starts). He also played in three games for the Wisconsin Timber Rattlers at the end of the season. He began 2013 with Wisconsin, and after posting a 1.80 ERA in three starts, he was promoted to the Brevard County Manatees and finished the season there, going 7-9 with a 3.63 ERA in 21 games (20 starts). In 2014, he pitched for the Huntsville Stars where he was 10-10 with a 3.96 ERA in 28 games (27 starts), and in 2015, he played with both the Biloxi Shuckers and the Colorado Springs Sky Sox, pitching to an 8-4 record and a 2.36 ERA in 26 games (17 starts). He began 2016 with Colorado Springs.

Suter was promoted to the major leagues on August 19, 2016. In 26 games for Colorado Springs prior to his promotion he was 6-6 with a 3.50 ERA. Suter made his MLB debut that night against the Seattle Mariners at Safeco Field. He spent the remainder of the season with Milwaukee, compiling a 2-2 record with a 3.32 ERA in 14 games (12 being relief appearances). Suter spent 2017 with both Colorado Springs and Milwaukee. In ten games for the Sky Sox he was 3-1 with a 4.42 ERA, and in 22 games for Milwaukee, he was 3-2 with a 3.42 ERA.

Suter began 2018 with Milwaukee. On May 8, 2018, against the Cleveland Indians, he hit his first career home run off of Corey Kluber that went 433 feet to center field. On July 31, 2018, Suter underwent Tommy John surgery on his left elbow, ending his 2018 season prematurely.

Suter began the 2019 season on the injured list as he continued to recover from his Tommy John surgery. He was activated on September 1 and allowed just one run in 18.1 innings in relief and was named National League reliever of the month for September. The next season, Suter had a solid year, recording a 2-0 record and a 3.13 ERA with 38 strikeouts in  innings pitched. In 2020, Suter was nominated for the Roberto Clemente Award.

In 2021, Suter posted a 12–5 record with a 3.07 ERA and 69 strikeouts in  innings. He led the major leagues with 12 relief wins.

Colorado Rockies
On November 18, 2022, Suter was claimed off waivers by the Colorado Rockies. He signed a one-year, $3 million contract to avoid arbitration.

Personal
Suter and his wife, Erin, were married in 2015, and reside in Cincinnati, Ohio. Together, they have 2 sons.

Suter wrote a children's book titled The Binky Bandit that was released on June 6, 2022.

References

External links

Harvard Crimson bio

1989 births
Living people
Baseball players from Cincinnati
Baseball players from Chicago
Major League Baseball pitchers
Milwaukee Brewers players
Harvard Crimson baseball players
Wareham Gatemen players
Helena Brewers players
Wisconsin Timber Rattlers players
Brevard County Manatees players
Huntsville Stars players
Biloxi Shuckers players
Colorado Springs Sky Sox players
Tigres de Aragua players
American expatriate baseball players in Venezuela